is a Japanese voice actress from Kanagawa Prefecture. She is affiliated with Haikyō.

Biography

Filmography

Television animation
Invaders of the Rokujyōma!? (2014), Kiriha Kurano
Monthly Girls' Nozaki-kun (2014), Female Student; Heroine; Senpai
Food Wars! (2015), Female University Student B
The Idolmaster Cinderella Girls: 2nd Season (2015), Ayame Hamaguchi
Mikagura School Suite (2015), Student; Woman
School-Live! (2015), Female Student B
Senki Zesshō Symphogear GX (2015), Phara Suyūf
Tantei Kageki Milky Holmes TD (2015), Nobles
Valkyrie Drive: Mermaid (2015), Kasumi Shigure
World Break: Aria of Curse for a Holy Swordsman (2015), Salesperson
Yamada-kun and the Seven Witches (2015), Rika Saionji, Jun Inose
Your Lie in April (2015), Nagi's Friend
Re:Stage! Dream Days♪ (2019), Mizuha Ichikishima
Didn't I Say to Make My Abilities Average in the Next Life?! (2019), Pauline
Is the Order a Rabbit? BLOOM (2020), Rei
Uma Musume Pretty Derby Season 2 (2021), Ikuno Dictus
Peach Boy Riverside (2021), Sleep Ogre
Platinum End (2021), Fuyuko Kohinata

Original video animation (OVA)
Yamada-kun and the Seven Witches (2015), Rika Saionji, Jun Inose, Nene Odagiri Fanclub Member C, Female Student
Your Lie in April (2015), Sawa

Video Games
Koi Q Bu! (2014), Ayatsuji Serika
Onsoku Shōjotai Photon Angels (2015), Judy, Ema
Fire Emblem if (2015), Belka
Yomecolle (2015), Kurano Kiriha
Yuki Yuna is a Hero: Hanayui no Kirameki (2017), Masuzu Aki
Alice Gear Aegis (2018), Anna Usamoto
Onsen Musume (2018), Kei Tamatsukuri
Azur Lane (2020), Chapayev
Heaven Burns Red (2022), Seira Sakuraba

Web Radio
Radio Dot I Tazawa Masumi no gohan ōmori + 50 yen (AG-ON： June 4 - September 26, 2014)
"Yamada-kun and the Seven Witches" Web Radio "Listener-kun and the Two Witches" (Animate TV: March 27 - July 3, 2015)

References

External links
 Official agency profile 
 

Living people
Japanese video game actresses
Japanese voice actresses
Tokyo Actor's Consumer's Cooperative Society voice actors
Voice actresses from Kanagawa Prefecture
21st-century Japanese actresses
Year of birth missing (living people)